African cherry may refer to:

 Prunus africana, a tree native to central and southern Africa
 Tieghemella heckelii (syn. Mimusops heckelii), cherry mahogany, a tree native to central Africa

See also
 African cherry orange (Citropis), a genus of flowering plants
 Cherry, the fruit of various trees in the genus Prunus

Plant common name disambiguation pages